Enzo Benedetti (11 June 1931 – 3 January 2017) was an Italian football midfielder and manager.

References

1931 births
2017 deaths
Italian footballers
Serie A players
Serie B players
Spezia Calcio players
Latina Calcio 1932 players
Palermo F.C. players
A.S. Siracusa managers
Frosinone Calcio managers
Sportspeople from the Province of La Spezia
Association football midfielders
Cosenza Calcio managers
Footballers from Liguria
Italian football managers
Italy women's national football team managers